Le Siècle ("The Age") is a daily newspaper that was published from 1836 to 1932 in France.

History
In 1836, Le Siècle was founded as a paper that supported constitutional monarchism. However, when the July Monarchy came to an end in 1848, the paper soon changed its editorial stance to one of republicanism. Le Siècle opposed the rise of Napoleon III. The paper's relevance waned during the Third French Republic to the point where it was forced to cease publication in 1932 due to a lack of readers.

In 1860, at the peak of its popularity, the paper had a circulation of over 52,000.

References
Bellet, Roger, Presse et journalisme sous le Second Empire, Paris, Armand Colin, 1967.

External links 
 Digitized issues of Le Siècle from 1836 to 1932 in Gallica, the digital library of the BnF

1836 establishments in France
1932 disestablishments in France
Defunct newspapers published in France
French penny papers
Daily newspapers published in France
Publications established in 1836
Publications disestablished in 1932